An ecclesiastical decoration is an order or a decoration conferred by a head of a church.

Catholic ecclesiastical decorations

Orders, decorations, and medals of the Holy See

Other Catholic distinctions

Local ecclesiastical distinctions
 Jerusalem Pilgrim's Cross, established in 1901, conferred in the name of the Sovereign Pontiff at the office of the Custody of the Holy Land of the Order of Friars Minor in Jerusalem, Israel
 Cross of Honour of the Abbot of Lilienfeld, founded in 1980, of the Abbot of Lilienfeld, Austria
 Order of Saint Nicholas, a regional lay order founded in 1991 by Bishop Ignatius Ghattas of the Melkite Greek Catholic Eparchy of Newton
 Medal, Great Cross, and Golden Order of the Maronite General Council of the Maronite Church
 Cross of São Tomé of the Roman Catholic Diocese of São Tomé and Príncipe in São Tomé and Príncipe

Eastern Orthodox ecclesiastical decorations 
Several autocephalous churches of the Eastern Orthodox communion award ecclesiastical decorations.

Others include:

 The Byzantine Order of the Holy Sepulchre, awarded by the Greek Orthodox Church of Jerusalem.
 The  (est. 1935), awarded by the Finnish Orthodox Church.
 The Order of Bishop Platon (est. 1922), awarded by the Estonian Apostolic Orthodox Church.

Anglican Communion

In addition to the Lambeth degree, the Archbishop of Canterbury awards the following to recognise outstanding service in various fields.
 Archbishop of Canterbury's Award for Outstanding Service to the Anglican Communion
 Cross of St Augustine for contributions to the life of the worldwide Communion, or to a particular autonomous church within Anglicanism, or members of other traditions who have made a conspicuous contribution to ecumenism
 Lambeth Cross for Ecumenism
 Canterbury Cross for Services to the Church of England
Archbishop's Awards for ministry priority areas (six awards named after former Archbishops of Canterbury) 
Dunstan Award for Prayer and the Religious Life
Hubert Walter Award for Reconciliation and Interfaith Cooperation
Alphege Award for Evangelism and Witness
Lanfranc Award for Education and Scholarship
Langton Award for Community Service
Cranmer Award for Worship

Methodism
Honourable Order of Jerusalem, the highest distinction presented by the World Methodist Council. It is conferred for exceptional service to the Methodist Church.

See also

Ecclesiastical award
List of religion-related awards

References

 
 
 
 
Anglican ecclesiastical decorations
Ecclesiastical decorations